Plume is the fourth studio album by Canadian musician Scott Morgan under the alias of Loscil. It was released in 2006 by Kranky.

Release
Plume was released by Kranky via compact disc on May 22, 2006, and had a release on vinyl disc on October 10, 2015.

Track listing
All songs composed and produced by Scott Morgan.
 "Motoc" – 6:29
 "Rorschach" – 8:20
 "Zephyr" – 5:19
 "Steam" – 6:59
 "Chinook" – 6:55
 "Bellows" – 6:57
 "Halcyon" – 7:22
 "Charlie" – 8:49
 "Mistral" – 6:01

Reception
Plume was received mediocre to good, being compared to Brian Eno and Tangerine Dream. However, the album was criticized for its repetitiveness.

Video game soundtrack use
The track "Rorschach" was used in the 2009 video game Osmos.

See also
 2006 in music
 Osmos

References

Loscil albums
Kranky albums